Västerås central station (Swedish: Västerås resecentrum or Västerås centralstation) is a railway station in Västerås, Sweden on the Mälarbanan railway. It was originally designed by Statens Järnvägars Arkitektkontor under the leadership of Adolf W. Edelsvärd. The moving and extension of the station and the addition of a new bridge was designed by architects SAR Lars Westerberg and Charlie Gullström at Gullstöm Westerberg Arkitektkontor AB in collaboration with architect SAR Laszlo Marko. 

The owner of the station is Västerås Central AB, which is jointly owned by Jernhusen AB (51%) and Västerås stad (49%).

Gallery

References

Railway stations opened in 1875
Railway stations in Västmanland County
Buildings and structures in Västerås